The Ulkatcho First Nation is a Dakelh First Nations government in the Canadian province of British Columbia.  It is a member of the Carrier Chilcotin Tribal Council, and its offices are located in Anahim Lake, British Columbia at the western edge of the Chilcotin District.  The Ulkatcho government is responsible for 22 Indian reserves with a population of 729 members living on-reserve, and another 200 living off reserve.  Its people are of the Ulkatchot’en ethnic group, a subgroup of the Carrier (Dakelh). Ulkatcho people have intermarried heavily with both Nuxalk and Chilcotin people and share territory in the Coast Range with the Nuxalk. Many distinctively Ulkatcho family names, such as Cahoose, Capoose, Sill, Squinas, and Stilas come from Nuxalk.

Name
The name Ulkatcho is an anglicisation of Ulhk'acho, the name of one village, now disused, on Gatcho Lake. Ulhk'acho means "big bounteous place", a place with bountiful fish, game, and other resources. It is based on the root k'a "fat".

Chief and councillors

Current
Lynda Price, Chief
Anthony Sims
Corrine Cahoose
Laurie Vaughan
Mabelene Leon
Rhonda Cahoose (replacing Harvey Sulin)

Former chiefs
Betty Cahoose
Zack Parker
Alan Weselowski
Cassidy Sill
Jimmy Stillas
Vivan Cahoose

Reserves

The figures following each reserve name are its area, in hectares.

Ulkatcho Indian Reserve No. 1,                     1   ha.
Squinas Indian Reserve No. 2,                     400   ha.
Thomas Squinas Ranch Indian Reserve No. 2A,      248.5 ha.
Towdystan Lake Indian Reserve No. 3,             258.2 ha.
Abuntlet Lake Indian Reserve No. 4,              129.5 ha.
Ulkatcho Indian Reserve No. 5,                   129.6 ha.
Uklatcho Indian Reserve No. 6,                   129.5 ha.
Salmon River Indian Reserve Meadow No. 7,         96.3 ha.
Cahoose Indian Reserve No. 8,                    259   ha.
Cahoose Indian Reserve No. 10,                   198.7 ha.
Blackwater Meadow Indian Reserve No. 11,          57.5 ha.
Cahoose Indian Reserve No. 12,                    64.8 ha.
Ulkatcho Indian Reserve No. 13,                  194   ha.
Louis Squinas Ranch Indian Reserve No. 14,       356.3 ha.
Ulkatcho Indian Reserve No. 14A,                 256.6 ha.
Casimiel Meadows Indian Reserve No. 15A,            64.8 ha.
Amy Cahoose Meadow Indian Reserve No. 16,        129.5 ha.
Tilgatko Indian Reserve No. 17,                   62.7 ha.
Betty Creek Indian Reserve No. 18,               129.5 ha.
Willow Meadow Indian Reserve No. 9,               59.5 ha.
Fishtrap Indian Reserve No. 19,                   20.2 ha.

Notable Ulkatcho people

Carey Price, professional ice hockey goaltender and Olympic champion, son of current Chief Lynda Price.
Jimmy Stillas, former chief whose death was one of the incidents leading to the Cariboo-Chilcotin Justice Inquiry.

See also

Dakelh
Carrier language

References

Birchwater, Sage. 1991. 'Ulkatcho'ten: the People of Ulkatcho. Anahim Lake, B.C.: Ulkatcho Indian Band.
Goldman, Irving. 1940. “The Alkatcho Carrier of British Columbia,” in Linton, Ralph (ed.) Acculturation in Seven American Indian Tribes. New York: Appleton-Century pp. 333–389
Goldman, Irving. 1943. “The Alkatcho Carrier: Historical Background of Crest Prerogatives,” American Anthropologist 41.396-421.
Indian and Northern Affairs. Ulkatcho First Nation entry in Indian and Northern Affairs Canada First Nations profiles

External links
Ulkatcho First Nation web site
Location map of Ulkatcho First Nation, Atlas of Canada, Natural Resources Canada
CBC news item on Ulkatcho criticism of fire fighting programs

Chilcotin Country
Dakelh governments